Thomas Cajetan (20 February 14699 August 1534), also known as Gaetanus,  commonly Tommaso de Vio or Thomas de Vio, was an Italian philosopher, theologian, cardinal (from 1517 until his death) and the Master of the Order of Preachers 1508 to 1518.  He was a leading theologian of his day who is now best known as the spokesman for Catholic opposition to the teachings of Martin Luther and the Protestant Reformation while he was the Pope's Legate in Augsburg, and among Catholics for his extensive commentary on the Summa Theologica of Thomas Aquinas.

He is not to be confused with his contemporary, Saint Cajetan, the founder of the Theatines.

Life
De Vio was born in Gaeta, then part of the Kingdom of Naples, as Jacopo Vio. The name Tommaso was taken as a monastic name, while the surname Cajetan derives from his native city.  At the age of fifteen he entered the Dominican order and devoted himself to the study of the philosophy of St. Thomas Aquinas, becoming before the age of thirty a doctor of theology at Padua, and subsequently professor of metaphysics.

A public disputation at Ferrara (1494) with Pico della Mirandola made his reputation as a theologian. He became general procurator in 1507 and general of the Dominicans a year later in 1508. For his zeal in defending the papal rights against the 1511 Council of Pisa, in a series of works which were condemned by the Sorbonne and publicly burnt by order of King Louis XII, he obtained the bishopric of Gaeta, and in 1517 Pope Leo X made him a cardinal and archbishop of Palermo.

He appears in 1511 as a supporter of the pope against the claims of the Council of Pisa (1511–1512), called by dissident cardinals to punish Pope Julius II, who had ignored the electoral capitulations he had accepted before being elected.  Cajetan composed in defense of his position the Tractatus de Comparatione auctoritatis Papæ et conciliorum ad invicem. Jacques Almain answered this work, and Cajetan replied in his Apologia.  Cajetan refused to accept Almain's argument that the Church's polity had to be similar to a lay regime, complete with limits on the ruler. At the Fifth Lateran Council (1512–17) which Pope Julius II set up in opposition to that of Pisa, De Vio played the leading role. During the second session of the council, in which he gave the opening oration, he brought about a decree recognizing the superiority of papal authority to that of councils.

In 1517, Leo X made him cardinal presbyter of San Sisto in Rome for his services. In the following year he became bishop of Palermo. He resigned as bishop of Palermo in 1519 to become bishop of Gaeta, as granted him by the Emperor Charles V for whose election De Vio had labored zealously. 

In 1518 he was sent as legate to the Diet of Augsburg and to him, at the wish of the Saxon elector, was entrusted the task of examining and testing the teachings of Luther.  According to Hilaire Belloc, "[Luther] had not been treated roughly by his opponents, the roughness had been on his side.  But things had gone against him, and he had been made to look foolish; he had been cross-examined into denying, for instance, the authority of a General Council—which authority was the trump card to play against the Papacy."

In 1519, De Vio helped in drawing up the bill of excommunication against Luther.

De Vio was employed in several other negotiations and transactions, being as able in business as in letters. In conjunction with Cardinal Giulio de' Medici in the conclave of 1521–1522, he secured the election of Adrian Boeyens, bishop of Tortosa, as Adrian VI. He retained influence under Clement VII, suffered a short term of imprisonment after the storming of Rome by the Constable of Bourbon and by Frundsberg (1527), retired to his bishopric for a few years, and, returning to Rome in 1530, assumed his old position of influence with Pope Clement, in whose behalf he wrote the decision rejecting the appeal for annulment from Catharine of Aragon made by Henry VIII of England. Nominated by Clement VII a member of the committee of cardinals appointed to report on the "Nuremberg Recess", he recommended, in opposition to the majority, certain concessions to the Lutherans, notably the marriage of the clergy as in the Greek Church and communion in both kinds according to the decision of the council of Basel.

Cardinal De Vio died in Rome in 1534.

Views

As a philosopher and logician, Cajetan defended the idea of analogy.

Though as a theologian De Vio was a scholastic of the older Thomist type, his general position was that of the moderate reformers of the school to which Reginald Pole, later archbishop of Canterbury, also belonged; i.e., he desired to retain the best elements of the humanist revival in harmony with Catholic orthodoxy illumined by a revived appreciation of the Augustinian doctrine of justification. In the field of Thomistic philosophy, he showed striking independence of judgment, expressing liberal views on marriage and divorce, denying the existence of a material Hell and advocating the celebration of public prayers in the vernacular.

Some Dominicans regarded his views as too independent of those of Saint Thomas. The Sorbonne in Paris found some of these views heterodox, and in the 1570 edition of his celebrated commentary on Aquinas' Summa, the objectionable passages were expunged. In this spirit he wrote commentaries upon portions of Aristotle and upon the Summa of Aquinas, and towards the end of his life made a careful translation of the Old and New Testaments, excepting Solomon's Song, the Prophets and the Revelation of St John. Cajetan also wrote opinions on subjects of practical importance, such as the disposition of plundered goods the ownership of which could not be determined.

Of the Reformation he remained a steadfast opponent, composing several works directed against Martin Luther, and taking an important part in shaping the policy of the papal delegates in Germany. Learned though he was in the scholastics, he recognized that to fight the reformers he would need a deeper knowledge of the Scriptures than he possessed. To this study he devoted himself with characteristic zeal, wrote commentaries on the greater part of the Old and the New Testament, and in the exposition of his text, which he treated critically, allowed himself considerable latitude in departing from literal and traditional interpretations.

De Vio is reported as making a statement some might find controversial:

In contrast to the majority of Italian cardinals of his day, De Vio was a man of austere piety and fervent zeal. And from the standpoint of the Dominican idea of the supreme necessity of maintaining ecclesiastical discipline, he defended the rights of the papacy and proclaimed that the pope should be "the mirror of God on earth."

Modern assessment

On Aquinas
In the mid-twentieth century, Cajetan's thought came to be assessed negatively by certain Catholic commentators who, in reacting against neo-Thomist thought, portrayed Cajetan as the first person to make mistaken interpretations of the thought of Thomas Aquinas.

Fergus Kerr wrote a 2002 book, After Aquinas, attacking Cajetan on this.  Among others, he cited Étienne Gilson, who was responding to arguments that 'philosophy' and 'Christianity' were incompatible disciplines, there existed in Hellenistic Judaism, patristic thought and the medieval period a way of thinking, animated by the ancient Greek quest for the cause of being, which could rightly be called 'Christian philosophy'. In Gilson's account, it was in Cajetan's thought that this link was first broken, since Cajetan, influenced by Scotism, reduced Thomas Aquinas's metaphysics of the existential act of being to an ontology of substance. Cajetan and his successors therefore, in Gilson's account, represented Thomas as focused on the forms and essences of beings only, and not on the existence of all things as participation in the pure actuality which is God. Accordingly, for Gilson, 'philosophy' and 'Christianity' are only incompatible if Christian thought is understood in its tradition post-Cajetan—a tradition which is worse than the older, more distinguished tradition of Christian thought.  Henri de Lubac wrote in Surnaturel (1946), an account of Aqunias's views on the natural and the supernatural, that Cajetan's interpretation of Aqunias, while influential, was incorrect.  De Lubac argued that Cajetan treated Aquinas as an Aristotelian, working with a definition of nature from Aristotle's Physics, which effectively turned human nature into a reality essentially closed in on itself, with its own intrinsic powers, desires and goals. De Lubac did not think Aqunias was an Aristolean, and that subsequent Catholic thought produced mistaken readings of Thomas Aquinas's account of the relationship between nature and grace.  

In 2006, Ralph McInerny and other scholars have challenged the negative assessment of Cajetan's work made by Lubac and Gilson. McInerny writes that the criticisms of Cajetan are not in fact supported by evidence from his works, and furthermore that it is not Cajetan but Gilson whose interpretation of Aquinas is a departure from the latter's own beliefs.

Other
Bruce Metzger wrote that Cajetan's Biblical commentaries were surprisingly "modern", anticipating Biblical textual criticism.  Notably, Cajetan resurfaced earlier Christian doubts as to the apostolic authorship of the Epistles of James, Jude, 2 John, and 3 John, as well as opposing Pauline authorship of the Epistle to the Hebrews, all positions modern scholars concur with.

Works

Opera omnia (5 vols., 1639)
Opuscula omnia (1530)
 
Commentary on Saint Thomas' Summa theologiae (1540)
De divina institutione Pontificatus Romani Pontificis (1521)
In Porphyrii Isagogen (1934)
De comparatione auctoritatis papae and Apologia (1936) 
De Anima (1938) 
Scripta philosophica (6 vols., edited by P. Zammit, M.-H. Laurent and J. Coquelle, 1934–39)

References

Footnotes

Sources
 "Aktenstücke uber das Verhalten der römischen Kurie zur Reformation, 1524‑1531," in Quellen und Forschungen (Kön. Press. Hist. Inst., Rome), vol. iii. p. 1‑20; TM Lindsay, History of the Reformation, vol. i. (Edinburgh, 1906).

Catholic Encyclopedia article
 Conciliarism and Papalism, trans. J. H. Burns and Thomas M. Izbicki, Cambridge: Cambridge University Press, 1997.

External links

1469 births
1534 deaths
Academic staff of the University of Padua
People from Gaeta
16th-century Italian cardinals
16th-century Italian Roman Catholic theologians
Counter-Reformation
Roman Catholic archbishops of Palermo
Bishops of Gaeta
Italian philosophers
Catholic philosophers
Italian Dominicans
Thomists
16th-century Italian Roman Catholic archbishops
16th-century philosophers
16th-century Italian writers
University of Padua alumni
Masters of the Order of Preachers
Dominican cardinals